A.S.D. Sambiase Lamezia 1923 is an Italian association football club based in Lamezia Terme, Calabria.

History 
The club has its origins in the former municipality of Sambiase, that was merged with the neighboring municipalities of Nicastro and Eufemia to create Lamezia Terme in 1968. The club, founded in 1923, made its debut in Prima Divisione Calabria in the 1948–49 season. In 1952 the club was excluded from all the championships after a riot following the result of a match with Oppido Mamertina: Only in 1962 the club was reformed with the denomination S.C. Sambiase. Following the refounding, the club had a series of season with mixed results, until promotion in Serie D under the leadership of Presidents Costabile and Misuraca and Thomas De Pietri and Marcello Pasquino: this spell lasted from 1984 to 1989.

The club returned in Serie D in 2009, finishing 10th in the 2009–10 season, 4th in the 2010–11 one, and 10th in the 2010–11 one. In the 2020-21 season finishing 1st and win Eccellenza Calabria championship with manager Danilo Fanello.

Colors and badge 
The team's colours are red and yellow.

Staff 2020-21

Honours
ASD Sambiase 1923
Eccellenza Calabria: 2020–21

References

External links
Official homepage

Football clubs in Calabria
1923 establishments in Italy